Bezirk Murau is a district of the state of Styria in Austria.

Municipalities
Since the 2015 Styria municipal structural reform, it consists of the following municipalities:

 Krakau
 Mühlen
 Murau
 Neumarkt in der Steiermark
 Niederwölz
 Oberwölz
 Ranten
 Sankt Georgen am Kreischberg
 Sankt Lambrecht
 Sankt Peter am Kammersberg
 Scheifling
 Schöder
 Stadl-Predlitz
 Teufenbach-Katsch

Municipalities before 2015
Suburbs, hamlets and other subdivisions of a municipality are indicated in small characters.
 Dürnstein in der Steiermark
Wildbad Einöd
 Frojach-Katsch
Frojach, Katsch an der Mur, Saurau
 Krakaudorf
 Krakauhintermühlen
 Krakauschatten
 Kulm am Zirbitz
 Laßnitz bei Murau
Laßnitz-Lambrecht, Laßnitz-Murau, Sankt Egidi
 Mariahof
Baierdorf
 Mühlen
Jakobsberg, Noreia, Sankt Veit in der Gegend
 Murau
 Neumarkt in Steiermark
 Niederwölz
 Oberwölz Stadt
Oberwölz, Vorstadt
 Oberwölz Umgebung
Hinterburg, Krumegg, Raiming, Salchau, Schöttl
 Perchau am Sattel
 Predlitz-Turrach
Einach, Predlitz, Turrach
 Ranten
Freiberg, Seebach
 Rinegg
 Sankt Blasen
 Sankt Georgen ob Murau
Bodendorf, Lutzmannsdorf, Sankt Lorenzen ob Murau
 Sankt Lambrecht
 Sankt Lorenzen bei Scheifling
Feßnach, Puchfeld
 Sankt Marein bei Neumarkt
Sankt Georgen bei Neumarkt
 Sankt Peter am Kammersberg
Althofen, Feistritz am Kammersberg, Kammersberg, Mitterdorf, Peterdorf, Pöllau am Greim
 Sankt Ruprecht-Falkendorf 
Falkendorf, Sankt Ruprecht ob Murau
 Scheifling
Lind bei Scheifling
 Schöder
Baierdorf, Schöderberg
 Schönberg-Lachtal
Dürnberg, Schönberg bei Niederwölz
 Stadl an der Mur
Paal, Sonnberg, Stadl an der Mur, Steindorf
 Stolzalpe
 Teufenbach
 Triebendorf
 Winklern bei Oberwölz
Eselsberg, Mainhartsdorf
 Zeutschach

References

 
Districts of Styria